Some Girl(s) is a 2013 American comedy film directed by Daisy von Scherler Mayer and written by Neil LaBute. It is based on the play of the same name, also written by LaBute. The film stars Adam Brody, Kristen Bell, Zoe Kazan, Mía Maestro, Jennifer Morrison and Emily Watson. The film was released on June 26, 2013, by Leeden Media.

Cast
Adam Brody as The Man
Kristen Bell as Bobbi
Zoe Kazan as Reggie
Mía Maestro as Tyler
Jennifer Morrison as Sam
Emily Watson as Lindsay
Laura Mann as Flight Attendant 
Kathleen Christy as Flight Attendant #2

Release
The film premiered at South by Southwest on March 9, 2013. The film was released on June 26, 2013, by Leeden Media.

References

External links
 
 

2013 films
2013 comedy films
2000s English-language films
American films based on plays
American comedy films
Films directed by Daisy von Scherler Mayer
Films set in Boston
Films set in Chicago
Films set in Los Angeles
Films set in Seattle
Films shot in Los Angeles
2010s English-language films
2010s American films